Dominic Matteo (born 28 April 1974) is a Scottish former professional footballer who played as a defender and midfielder in a 17-year professional career from 1992 to 2009. He made a total of 366 league and cup appearances, of which 276 were in the Premier League. 

Matteo played for Liverpool, Sunderland, Leeds United, Blackburn Rovers and Stoke City. His most notable individual moment was his goal in the Champions League against A.C. Milan. The latter part of his career was increasingly affected by injuries, which led to his retirement in 2009 at the age of 35. He struggled with gambling addictions and was declared bankrupt in 2015. He was capped six times by Scotland after originally representing England at under-21 and 'B' team level.

Early life
Dominic Matteo was born in Dumfries on 28 April 1974. His birth mother, Margaret, was a 17-year-old pupil when she fell pregnant, naming him Stephen. Very young and without an income, she made "the most difficult decision of my life" in putting him up for adoption, being persuaded that it was the best decision by the adoption agency when told about his adoptive parents.

Matteo's adoptive father, who "wanted his boy to play like Cesare Maldini", ran Matthew's Cafe in Friars Vennel. His adoptive father had Italian heritage and was a keen follower of European football. The family moved to Southport in late 1978. His adoptive parents, Albert and Marie, only told him when he was seven years old that he was adopted, along with his older brother.

Club career

Liverpool
Matteo was spotted playing for Birkdale United by Liverpool player Kenny Dalglish, who had originally gone to Birkdale United just to watch his son, Paul Dalglish. He progressed to a YTS contract at the age of 16. His versatility counted against him, as he was asked to play several positions in the reserve team and subsequently failed to establish himself in one position. However, he impressed enough to win a one-year professional contract at the age of 18. He then signed a new two-year contract in 1993.

He made his Premier League debut for the "Reds" on 23 October 1993, when he replaced an injured John Barnes at left-wing in a 1–1 draw with Manchester City at Maine Road. He made a total of 13 appearances during the 1993–94 season. He joined Mick Buxton's Sunderland on loan in March 1995, but made just one First Division appearance for the "Black Cats", in a 2–0 defeat to Barnsley at Oakwell on 24 March. After the game it transpired that his loan had not been registered in time, leaving him unable to play for Sunderland; though he had technically been an ineligible player against Barnsley, Sunderland escaped with only a £2,500 fine.

He scored two goals for Liverpool, one against Southampton in the Premier League and another against Huddersfield Town in the FA Cup. After making arguably his biggest impact at Anfield in the 1999–2000 season, Matteo was expected to become a first team regular, but was instead sold to Leeds United in August 2000. He made 155 appearances and scored two goals for Liverpool.

Leeds United
In August 2000 he joined Leeds United despite failing his medical with the club. He made his team debut against A.C. Milan the following month, in a UEFA Champions League contest. He was one of Leeds' best players through their 2000–01 Champions League campaign, in which they achieved a semi-final place. He is fondly remembered by Leeds fans especially for the goal he scored at the San Siro against Milan, in the first group stage which ensured they would progress through to the next round. He ended that Champions League campaign with two goals, having also scored earlier against Beşiktaş.

When Rio Ferdinand moved to Manchester United in the summer of 2002, Matteo was handed team captaincy. Leeds were relegated at the end of 2003–04, despite Matteo's two goals against Fulham and Wolverhampton Wanderers.

His book, In My Defence, was published in 2011. In an interview, given at the time of the book's release, he said that he had liked working with David O'Leary and Peter Ridsdale at Leeds; " I loved working with David. He had been a great central defender at Arsenal. But, as things started to get on top of us, he spent more time in his office. He was nowhere near a failure and, if you finished fifth now, you would not expect the sack."

Blackburn Rovers
In July 2004, Matteo signed a three-year contract with Blackburn Rovers. He made his Blackburn debut against West Bromwich Albion in a 1–1 draw. He scored his first and only goal for Blackburn in a 3–0 win over Colchester United in the FA Cup.

Stoke City
In January 2007, Matteo moved to Championship side Stoke City on a free transfer. Signing a short-term contract until the summer, he played a total of 10 games and scoring one goal against Derby County. Matteo still continued to play for Stoke during the club's 2007–08 pre-season campaign, despite being out of contract. However, he was offered a new 12-month contract by the club on 10 August 2007. He was made captain by Tony Pulis in the season Stoke won promotion back to the top flight of the English football league system. Matteo played 13 league games up to the end of October after which he played only once more before the end of the season, a game in November 2007. This was the last game of his playing career due to injury.

International career
Matteo won Under-21 and 'B' caps for England, and was also called up for the main squad on two occasions but was never capped. He later was called up for the Scotland side, having been born and lived as a young boy in Dumfries. He went on to collect six caps for Scotland, making his debut against Australia in November 2000. After injury problems, he retired from international duty to concentrate on his career at Leeds United.

Personal life
While at Stoke Matteo progressed studying for his UEFA coaching qualifications.

In his autobiography and interviews associated with its launch, Matteo admitted having run up over £1,000,000 in gambling debts. He recalled betting £200,000 on a single horse race, although that bet won. Matteo was declared bankrupt in 2015. His book also repeatedly referenced Matteo being involved in a culture of heavy drinking.

In May 2013, Matteo returned to Leeds United in a new role as a Football Ambassador. He left this position in the summer of 2014 following a change of ownership to Massimo Cellino. In November 2019, Matteo underwent surgery on a brain tumour, and was declared fully recovered in April the following year.

Career statistics

See also
List of sportspeople who competed for more than one nation

References
General
 

Specific

1974 births
Living people
Footballers from Dumfries
English people of Italian descent
Scottish footballers
England under-21 international footballers
England B international footballers
Scotland international footballers
Association football fullbacks
Association football midfielders
Liverpool F.C. players
Sunderland A.F.C. players
Leeds United F.C. players
Blackburn Rovers F.C. players
Stoke City F.C. players
Premier League players
English Football League players
Scottish autobiographers
Anglo-Scots
Leeds United F.C. non-playing staff